Grand Duchess Maria Mikhailovna of Russia (Russian: Мария Михайловна) (9 March 1825 – 19 November 1846) was the firstborn child and first daughter of Grand Duke Michael Pavlovich, the youngest son of Emperor Paul I of Russia, and Princess Charlotte of Württemberg, the eldest daughter of Prince Paul of Württemberg, who took the name Elena Pavlovna upon converting to Russian Orthodoxy. Maria died, unmarried and without issue, at the age of 21 in Vienna.

Biography

She was the first child of Grand Duke Michael Pavlovich and Princess Charlotte of Württemberg. Her upbringing and education received increased attention and influence from her mother. Grand Duke Michael very much wanted a son, from which he could raise a soldier. But in his only surviving children were girls, whose upbringing he left up to his wife. However, Michael Pavlovich could not deny himself the pleasure of introducing one of his military items into their program, arguing that each of his daughters was (like his mother) the chief of any cavalry regiment. Michael introduced his daughters to the cavalry and infantry signals on the bugle and drum.

In 1835 a children's magazine was published under the title Children's Library, dedicated to Grand Duchess Maria Mikhailovna (publisher AN Ochkin).

Death

Maria was known for her fragile health. The first signs of disease appeared on the eve of her twentieth birthday. The Grand Duchess died suddenly at the age of 21 on 19 November 1846 in Vienna in her father's arms. She is buried in the Peter and Paul Cathedral.

In memory of her and her sister, Elizaveta Mikhailovna, who died during childbirth in January 1845, Grand Duchess Elena Pavlovna organized the shelters of Elizabeth and Maria in St. Petersburg and Pavlovsk.

Honours

  Dame Grand Cordon of the Order of Saint Catherine (1783)

Ancestry

References 
 Maria Mikhaylovna and her portrait
 Portrait in the. book. Maria Mikhailovna

1825 births
1846 deaths
Russian grand duchesses
House of Holstein-Gottorp-Romanov
19th-century people from the Russian Empire
19th-century women from the Russian Empire
Burials at Saints Peter and Paul Cathedral, Saint Petersburg